The Center for Automotive Research (CAR) is a nonprofit research organization based in Ann Arbor, Michigan that conducts research, forecasts trends, develops new methodologies, and advises on public policy.

History

Office for the Study of Automotive Transportation
Before its current status as an independent nonprofit research organization, CAR was part of the University of Michigan, under the name "Office for the Study of Automotive Transportation" which was a unit of the University of Michigan Transportation Research Institute.

Center for Automotive Research
In 2003, the Center for Automotive Research (CAR) was established as an independent non-profit research organization. CAR creates economic and systems modeling research, develops new manufacturing methodologies, forecasts industry futures, advises on public policy, and conducts industry conferences and forums. The institute is sometimes quoted by media for comments on industry issues. As an example of its economic research, CAR chairman emeritus David Cole has in relation to the Tesla Michigan dealership dispute said: "The value of Tesla is all based on hype and not substance".

Research Groups
CAR research is divided into three distinct research groups: Industry, Labor & Economics; Manufacturing, Engineering & Technology; and Transportation Systems Analysis.

Industry, Labor, & Economics
The Industry, Labor, & Economics Group researches the intersection of the automotive industry, technology, economy, society, and public policy, and is home to CAR's Automotive Communities Partnership. Their research encompasses a wide spectrum of automotive analysis, from employment, talent, skills, and labor issues to automotive trade, global competitiveness, and development in North America and in emerging economies, to quantifying the industry's economic contribution and industry trends. The group's research areas include automotive business, markets, economic contributions, investments, plants, products, people, and communities.

Manufacturing, Engineering & Technology
The Manufacturing, Engineering & Technology Group focuses on evolving technologies and manufacturing engineering systems, primarily in the automotive industry. Technology and product planning are combined with manufacturing to provide a comprehensive and strategic perspective. A significant effort continues to support improving the performance of vehicle development through research in manufacturing systems, tooling, and new technologies of car and light-truck bodies. Research is directed at reducing new vehicle development costs and lead time while improving product quality. Recent efforts have been aimed at technology assessment to support improved fuel economy through advanced powertrains and vehicle mass reduction. This group oversees several industry-led coalitions involving the automotive, utility, tooling, and materials industries.

Transportation Systems Analysis
The Transportation Systems Analysis group is concerned with the broad context within which motor vehicles are operated. Much of this effort focuses on the planning and operation of transportation infrastructure, as well as on interactions between infrastructure, vehicles, and vehicle operators. Increasingly, this research includes communications technology as a key component of these interactions. In this area, the group is heavily involved in connected vehicle and intelligent transportation systems work. Ultimately, the goals of these efforts are to help both the automotive and transportation industries deploy technologies that enhance safety, improve mobility, contribute to economic vitality, and reduce the environmental consequences of transportation.

Events

Breakfast Briefing Series
The CAR Breakfast Briefings are an educational series, smaller than the flagship Management Briefing Seminars, with the same intent of educating industry participants, media and the general public, on a wide variety of emerging industry topics.

References

External links
 

Automotive industry in the United States
Research organizations in the United States